Şenköy is a village in the Yedisu District, Bingöl Province, Turkey. The village is populated by Kurds of the Canbegan tribe and had a population of 53 in 2021.

References 

Villages in Yedisu District